"Xmas Time of the Year" is a Christmas song recorded by American punk rock group Green Day. The song was released on December 24, 2015, to YouTube without any prior announcement about recording or releasing the song.

On November 29, 2019, the song was released to music streaming services such as Spotify and Apple Music, along with new cover artwork reflecting their current album cycle, Father of All Motherfuckers.

References

Green Day songs
Songs written by Billie Joe Armstrong
2015 singles
2015 songs
American Christmas songs
Songs written by Mike Dirnt
Songs written by Tré Cool